Honeoye Falls Village Historic District is a national historic district at Honeoye Falls in Monroe County, New York, USA. The district encompasses 217 residential, industrial, commercial, religious, civic and educational properties in the historic core of the village of Honeoye Falls. It features substantially intact commercial architecture dating from about 1825 to about 1940.

It was listed on the National Register of Historic Places in 1993.

References

Historic districts on the National Register of Historic Places in New York (state)
Historic districts in Monroe County, New York
National Register of Historic Places in Monroe County, New York